Elliott is an American Emo band from Louisville, Kentucky. They released three albums and several 7"s in their eight-year career, and were signed to Revelation Records.

History

Formation and early releases (1995–1998)
The group was formed in 1995.

False Cathedrals (2000)
2000's False Cathedrals was a more polished affair than its predecessor, featuring vocal harmonies and more piano than US Songs. False Cathedrals is Elliott's most popular release. It was met with critical acclaim by a broad cross-section of the underground rock community.

Shortly after the completion of False Cathedrals, Palumbo and Mobley left the group to pursue other musical interests. Jason Skaggs took over on bass, and Falling Forward's Benny Clark was enlisted to play guitar. Clark's ethereal, effects-heavy sound would go on to have a significant impact on Elliott's music. In May 2001, the band dropped off a tour with the Toadies amid a "disagreement with management decisions".

Song in the Air, departure of Skaggs, and break up (2003)
Between March and May 2002, the band were recording an EP, which eventually turned into an album's worth of material. Following this, they toured across the US in May and June with Christiansen and Liars Academy. In August 2002, the band performed at Furnace Fest. In February and March, Elliott supported Further Seems Forever on their headlining US tour. Song in the Air was announced in December 2002, and released in April 2003, through Revelation Records. It marked another stylistic shift for the group, incorporating more post-rock influences, as well as live string arrangements by the Louisville group Rachel's. Pitchfork Media called Song in the Air "a far more dynamic and internally cohesive record than any of the group's previous efforts.".

Skaggs left the group shortly after the completion of Song in the Air. He was replaced by Billy Bisig. Shortly after Song in the Air release, Elliott announced their intention to break up. They completed final tours of Europe and the US, before disbanding in November 2003.

Posthumous
Members of Elliott have been busy since the group's demise. Singer/Guitarist Chris Higdon is now fronting the group Frontier(s) alongside members of Automatic, Mouthpiece, Enkindels, Stay Gold and others. They signed to No Sleep Records in March 2009; they later released their debut album There Will Be No Miracles through Arena Rock Recording Company in August 2010. Benny Clark is playing bass in a group named Parlour. Kevin Ratterman operates a recording studio called The Funeral Home.

Reformation
The band reunited in 2022 and are scheduled to play Furnace Fest the same year. Future plans are not known, but it's known that Jay Palumbo is involved.

Discography

References

External links
 

1995 establishments in Kentucky
2003 disestablishments in Kentucky
American emo musical groups
indie rock musical groups from Kentucky
musical groups disestablished in 2003
musical groups established in 1995
musical groups from Louisville, Kentucky
Tiny Engines artists